This is a list of yearly Yankee Conference football standings.

Yankee standings

References

Yankee Conference
Standings